Apocalyptic Revelation is the second album by Brazilian death metal band Krisiun.

Track listing

Credits
 Moyses Kolesne – guitars
 Max Kolesne – drums
 Alex Camargo – bass, vocals

Krisiun albums
1998 albums
GUN Records albums